This is a list of 160 species in Lucidota, a genus of fireflies in the family Lampyridae.

Lucidota species

 Lucidota albicollis (Blanchard in Brullé, 1846) i c g
 Lucidota albocincta (Pic, 1940) i c g
 Lucidota albocornuta (Pic, 1940) i c g
 Lucidota amabilis (Gorham, 1880) i c g
 Lucidota angustata (Motschulsky, 1854) i c
 Lucidota antennata Laporte, 1833 i c g
 Lucidota antonioi Pic, 1940 i c g
 Lucidota apicalis Gorham, 1880 i c g
 Lucidota apicicornis Gorham, 1880 i c g
 Lucidota apicipennis (Pic, 1927) i c g
 Lucidota appendiculata (Germar, 1824) i c g
 Lucidota approximans E. Olivier, 1885 i c g
 Lucidota argentina (Pic, 1928) i c g
 Lucidota armata (Gorham, 1884) i c g
 Lucidota atra (G. Olivier, 1790) i c g b  (black firefly)
 Lucidota audax E. Olivier, 1896 i c g
 Lucidota aurantiaca (Pic, 1929) i c g
 Lucidota baeri (Pic, 1927) i c g
 Lucidota banghaasi Pic, 1930 i c g
 Lucidota banoni Laporte, 1833 i c g
 Lucidota basalis Pic, 1930 i c g
 Lucidota bella Gorham, 1880 i c g
 Lucidota bicellonycha McDermott, 1958 i c g
 Lucidota bicolor Kirsch, 1873 i c g
 Lucidota binotata (Pic, 1929) i c
 Lucidota binotatens McDermott, 1966 i c g
 Lucidota bipartita Pic, 1927 i c g
 Lucidota blanchardi E. Olivier, 1899 i c g
 Lucidota bogotensis (Pic, 1931) i c
 Lucidota boliviana (Pic, 1927) i c g
 Lucidota bruneri Mutchler, 1923 i c g
 Lucidota caucaensis Pic, 1940 i c g
 Lucidota chevrolati Mutchler, 1923 i c g
 Lucidota chiriquiana Gorham, 1884 i c g
 Lucidota cincta (Motschulsky, 1854) i c
 Lucidota clermonti Pic, 1940 i c g
 Lucidota comitata Gorham, 1884 i c g
 Lucidota complanata Gorham, 1884 i c g
 Lucidota compressicornis (Fabricius, 1801) i c g
 Lucidota concors E. Olivier, 1909 i c g
 Lucidota conformis E. Olivier, 1907 i c g
 Lucidota conradti (Pic, 1940) i c
 Lucidota costata Pic, 1930 i c g
 Lucidota cucullata E. Olivier, 1896 i c g
 Lucidota dejeani Lucas, 1859 i c g
 Lucidota diaphanura Gorham, 1881 i c g
 Lucidota difformis Gorham, 1884 i c g
 Lucidota dilaticornis (Motschulsky, 1854) i c g
 Lucidota discivittata Pic, 1943 i c g
 Lucidota discoidea McDermott, 1966 i c g
 Lucidota discolor Gorham, 1881 i c g
 Lucidota dissimilis E. Olivier, 1909 i c g
 Lucidota duplicata E. Olivier, 1910 i c g
 Lucidota elapsa E. Olivier in Wytsman, 1907 i c g
 Lucidota elongata (Blanchard in Brullé, 1846) i c g
 Lucidota emerita E. Olivier, 1910 i c g
 Lucidota eucera E. Olivier in Wytsman, 1907 i c g
 Lucidota fenestrata Gorham, 1884 i c g
 Lucidota flabellicornis (Fabricius, 1781) i c g
 Lucidota flavipes (Motschulsky, 1854) i c g
 Lucidota fraudata E. Olivier, 1908 i c g
 Lucidota fulgurans Gorham, 1880 i c g
 Lucidota fulvotincta Mutchler, 1923 i c g
 Lucidota fuscata Gorham, 1884 i c g
 Lucidota geniculata Pic, 1930 i c g
 Lucidota gounelli (Pic, 1940) i c g
 Lucidota grandjeani (Pic, 1940) i c g
 Lucidota heterocera E. Olivier, 1910 i c g
 Lucidota heteroclita E. Olivier in Wytsman, 1907 i c g
 Lucidota heynei Pic, 1941 i c g
 Lucidota hickeri Pic, 1940 i c g
 Lucidota immemor E. Olivier, 1909 i c g
 Lucidota inaperta E. Olivier, 1886 i c g
 Lucidota inapicalis Pic, 1930 i c g
 Lucidota incompta Gorham, 1884 i c g
 Lucidota ingloria E. Olivier, 1899 i c g
 Lucidota insignita E. Olivier, 1911 i c g
 Lucidota interrupta (Pic, 1927) i c g
 Lucidota invida (E. Olivier, 1910) i c g
 Lucidota jucunda (E. Olivier, 1888) i c g
 Lucidota klugii (Motschulsky, 1853) i c g
 Lucidota latealba (Pic, 1927) i c g
 Lucidota laticornis Pic, 1943 i c g
 Lucidota latior Pic, 1930 i c g
 Lucidota lecontei (Kirsch, 1873) i c
 Lucidota limbata Gorham, 1880 i c g
 Lucidota liturata E. Olivier, 1907 i c g
 Lucidota lunata (Motschulsky, 1854) i c g
 Lucidota lunulata (Blanchard in Brullé, 1846) i c
 Lucidota luteicollis (LeConte, 1878) i c g b
 Lucidota luteohumeralis Pic, 1940 i c g
 Lucidota macrescens E. Olivier, 1909 i c g
 Lucidota malleri Pic, 1935 i c g
 Lucidota marginicollis Lucas, 1859 i c g
 Lucidota mellicula E. Olivier in Wytsman, 1907 i c g
 Lucidota misera E. Olivier, 1896 i c g
 Lucidota monacha E. Olivier, 1911 i c g
 Lucidota nobilis E. Olivier in Wytsman, 1907 i c g
 Lucidota oblongonotata E. Olivier, 1886 i c g
 Lucidota oculata E. Olivier, 1886 i c g
 Lucidota olivieri Pic, 1938 i c g
 Lucidota ornata E. Olivier, 1909 i c g
 Lucidota osculatii (Guérin-Méneville, 1855) i c g
 Lucidota pallidicollis (Blanchard in Brullé, 1846) i c g
 Lucidota pallipes McDermott, 1966 i c g
 Lucidota parallela (Pic, 1927) i c
 Lucidota parilis E. Olivier, 1909 i c g
 Lucidota parvicollis E. Olivier, 1885 i c g
 Lucidota pectinata (Fabricius, 1775) i c g
 Lucidota pennata Dejean, 1837 i c g
 Lucidota perpusilla E. Olivier, 1885 i c g
 Lucidota peruviana (Pic, 1927) i c g
 Lucidota phyllocera (Wiedemann, 1821) i c g
 Lucidota planicornis (Fabricius, 1801) i c g
 Lucidota plaumanni Pic, 1939 i c g
 Lucidota premarginalis Pic, 1938 i c g
 Lucidota probata E. Olivier, 1909 i c g
 Lucidota propinqua E. Olivier, 1909 i c g
 Lucidota proscripta E. Olivier, 1906 i c g
 Lucidota proxima Gorham, 1880 i c g
 Lucidota punctata (LeConte, 1852) i c g b
 Lucidota purulana (Gorham, 1884) i c g
 Lucidota pygidialis E. Olivier, 1886 i c g
 Lucidota pygmaea E. Olivier in Wytsman, 1907 i c g
 Lucidota quadratifera Lucas, 1859 i c g
 Lucidota quadriguttata Gorham, 1880 i c g
 Lucidota ramicornis Pic, 1932 i c g
 Lucidota reductitincta Pic, 1943 i c g
 Lucidota roseimaculata (Blanchard in Brullé, 1846) i c g
 Lucidota rufescens Pic, 1935 i c g
 Lucidota ruficollis (Motschulsky, 1854) i c g
 Lucidota rufithorax (E. Olivier, 1911) i c g
 Lucidota saepta E. Olivier, 1908 i c g
 Lucidota serricornis E. Olivier, 1909 i c g
 Lucidota severa (E. Olivier, 1911) i c g
 Lucidota sexguttata E. Olivier, 1886 i c g
 Lucidota signaticollis Pic, 1930 i c g
 Lucidota signaticornis E. Olivier in Wytsman, 1907 i c g
 Lucidota simoni E. Olivier, 1900 i c g
 Lucidota sinuaticollis Gorham, 1884 i c g
 Lucidota sparsicolor E. Olivier, 1913 i c g
 Lucidota subdubitata Mutchler, 1923 i c g
 Lucidota submaculata (Pic, 1940) i c g
 Lucidota subnigra Pic, 1940 i c g
 Lucidota supplex E. Olivier, 1909 i c g
 Lucidota taciturna E. Olivier, 1906 i c g
 Lucidota tardita E. Olivier, 1896 i c g
 Lucidota tenuecincta E. Olivier, 1911 i c g
 Lucidota tenuis E. Olivier, 1896 i c g
 Lucidota testaceipes (Pic, 1927) i c g
 Lucidota tincta Gorham, 1884 i c g
 Lucidota tricolor Gorham, 1880 i c g
 Lucidota tricostata Pic, 1935 i c g
 Lucidota tristicolor E. Olivier, 1909 i c g
 Lucidota tristis (Blanchard in Brullé, 1846) i c g
 Lucidota uberadana Pic, 1930 i c g
 Lucidota vitricollis Gorham, 1884 i c g
 Lucidota wagneri Pic, 1940 i c g
 Lucidota xanthocera Lucas, 1859 i c g
 Lucidota xanthopleura Gorham, 1884 i c g

Data sources: i = ITIS, c = Catalogue of Life, g = GBIF, b = Bugguide.net

References

Lucidota
Articles created by Qbugbot